Zdoroviye (literally "Health") is a health magazine published in the Soviet Union and then, in Russia.

History and profile 
Founded in 1955, Zdoroviye had a circulation of 12,600,000 copies in 1986. It was published monthly in Moscow by the Pravda Publishing House as a joint edition of the USSR and the RSFSR Ministries of Public Health, and covered popular scientific; medicine and hygiene. Its chief editor was M. Piradov.

References

External links
 Archive 1959-1991 

1955 establishments in Russia
Health in the Soviet Union
Health magazines
Magazines established in 1955
Magazines published in Moscow
Monthly magazines published in Russia
Russian-language magazines
Magazines published in the Soviet Union